Bruno Kuzuhara and Coleman Wong were the defending champions, but both players were no longer eligible to participate in junior events.

Learner Tien and Cooper Williams won the title, defeating Alexander Blockx and João Fonseca in the final, 6–4, 6–4.

Seeds

Draw

Finals

Top half

Bottom half

References

External links 
 Draw at itftennis.com
 Draw at ausopen.com

2023
Boys' doubles